The 1990 NCAA Division I Women's Lacrosse Championship was the ninth annual single-elimination tournament to determine the national championship for Division I National Collegiate Athletic Association (NCAA) women's college lacrosse. The championship game was played at Palmer Stadium in Princeton, New Jersey during May 1990.  

The Harvard Crimson won their first championship by defeating the Maryland Terrapins in the final, 8–7. 

The leading scorer for the tournament, with 10 goals, was Mary Ann Oelgoetz, from Maryland. The Most Outstanding Player trophy was not awarded this year.

Qualification 
All NCAA Division I women's lacrosse programs were eligible for this championship. A total of 6 teams were invited to participate in this single-elimination tournament.

Tournament bracket

Tournament outstanding players 
Julia French, Harvard
Charlotte Joslin, Harvard
Maggie Vaughan, Harvard
Mary Konder, Maryland
Mary Ann Oelgoetz, Maryland
Jenny Ulehla, Maryland

See also 
 NCAA Division I Women's Lacrosse Championship
 NCAA Division III Women's Lacrosse Championship
 1990 NCAA Division I Men's Lacrosse Championship

References

NCAA Division I Women's Lacrosse Championship
NCAA Division I Women's Lacrosse Championship
NCAA Women's Lacrosse Championship
Women's sports in New Jersey